Lophomilia is a genus of moths of the family Erebidae. The genus was described by Warren in 1913.

Species
 Lophomilia albicosta Yoshimoto, 1995
 Lophomilia albistria Yoshimoto, 1993
 Lophomilia diehli Kononenko & Behounek, 2009
 Lophomilia flaviplaga (Warren, 1912)
 Lophomilia fusca Sohn & Ronkay, 2011
 Lophomilia hoenei Berio, 1977
 Lophomilia kobesi Kononenko & Behounek, 2009
 Lophomilia kogii Sugi, 1977
 Lophomilia nekrasovi Kononenko & Behounek, 2009
 Lophomilia polybapta (Butler, 1879)
 Lophomilia posteburna Sohn & Ronkay, 2011
 Lophomilia rustica Kononenko & Behounek, 2009
 Lophomilia striatipurpurea Holloway, 1976
 Lophomilia takao Sugi, 1962
 Lophomilia violescens Yoshimoto, 1993

References

 Berio (1977). Annali del Museo Civico di Storia Naturale Giacomo Doria 81: 237, fig. 26.
 Butler (1879). Illustration typical specimens of Lepidoptera Heterocera in the collection of the British Museum 3: 66. pl.57:7.
 Kononenko, V. & Behounek, G. (2009). "A revision of the genus Lophomilia Warren, 1913 with description of four new species from East Asia (Lepidoptera: Noctuidae: Hypeninae)." Zootaxa 1989: 1-22.
 Holloway (1976). Moths of Borneo with special reference to Mount Kinabalu: 16, pl. 6: 68.
 Sugi (1962). Akitu 10: 37.
 Sugi (1977). Tyõ to Ga 28: 39.
 Warren (1912). Novitates Zoologicae 19: 38.
 Yoshimoto (1993). Moths of Nepal Tinea 13 (supplement 3): 77, pl. 53: 19.
 Yoshimoto (1995). Moths of Nepal Tinea 14 (supplement 2): 74, pl. 116: 11.

Acontiinae